Providence Saint John's Health Center, formerly St. Johns Hospital and Health Center, is a private not-for-profit, Roman Catholic hospital in Santa Monica, California, United States.  The hospital was founded in 1942 by the Sisters of Charity of Leavenworth. In 2014, the hospital was transferred to Providence Health & Services.

Notable patients

Birth
Patricia Kennedy Lawford, gave birth to her son Christopher Lawford on March 29, 1955.
Choreographer Michael Rooney was born here March 30, 1962.
Actress Mariska Hargitay was born there on January 23, 1964.
Comedian Adam Friedland was born here on April 10, 1987.
Lisa Marie Presley, Give birth to her eldest child Riley Keough in 1989.
Actresses Katie Holmes, Bridget Moynahan, and Brooke Shields gave birth.
First Lady of California Maria Shriver gave birth and had a nursery ward named in her honor in 2004.

Died
Vaudeville comedian Frank Fay - September 25, 1961.
 Songwriter Cole Porter on October 15, 1964 - kidney failure after surgery.
Jazz singer Nat King Cole - lung cancer on February 15, 1965.
Actor Lee Tracy - liver cancer on October 18, 1968.
Actor Charlie Ruggles - cancer on December 23, 1970.
Actress, Joi Lansing - breast cancer in 1972.
Actress Irene Ryan better known as Granny on "The Beverly Hillbillies" - glioblastoma and arteriosclerotic heart disease on April 26, 1973 at age 70.
Radio actor Ken Carpenter - October 16, 1984.
Television personality Johnny Olson - October 12, 1985 from complications from a stroke.
Actress Bonita Granville (1923–1988) - October 11, 1988.
Actor Ralph Bellamy - November 29, 1991 from a lung ailment.
 Cesar Romero - from complications of a blood clot on January 1, 1994.
Comedian George Carlin - heart failure on June 22, 2008 at age 71.
Animator Bill Melendez - September 2, 2008 at age 91.
Actor Patrick McGoohan - January 13, 2009 at age 80.
Actor Dom DeLuise - May 4, 2009 at age 75 due to kidney failure.
Actress Farrah Fawcett - June 25, 2009 at age 62 of anal cancer.
Actor Harve Presnell - Died - June 30, 2009 at age 75.
Director Blake Edwards - on December 15, 2010 at age 88 from complications from pneumonia.
Television personality Dick Clark - April 18, 2012 at age 82 of a heart attack.
Actress Karen Black - from ampullary cancer on August 8, 2013, at age 74.
Actor Dick Van Patten - complications from diabetes - on June 23, 2015 at age 86.
 Rock guitarist Eddie Van Halen - cerebrovascular accident - on October 6, 2020 at age 65.

Procedures/Treatments
Actor Richard Burton was treated there in 1974 for alcoholism.
Pianist Martha Argerich - Treated after her melanoma spread to her lungs. After she recovered, she gave a special concert benefiting the hospital.
Playboy Playmate Melissa Holliday underwent Electroconvulsive Therapy - in 1995.
Former US President Ronald Reagan, taken to St. John's in 2001 after falling and was determined to have a broken hip.
Governor of California Arnold Schwarzenegger was treated - for six broken ribs after a motorcycle accident, and received fifteen stitches here after a skiing accident, both in 2006.
Former First Lady of the United States Nancy Reagan, February 17, 2008, taken to St. John's after falling in her Bel Air home.

Notable donors 
Among those who have contributed significant donations to the center are:
 Johnny Carson
 Kay Kyser
 Paula Kent Meehan
 Patrick Soon-Shiong
 Jimmy Stewart

References

Hospital buildings completed in 1942
Catholic hospitals in North America
Hospitals in Los Angeles County, California
Buildings and structures in Santa Monica, California
Hospitals established in 1942
1942 establishments in California
Organizations based in Santa Monica, California